Vidyard is a software company headquartered in Kitchener, Ontario, that creates software to host and analyze video performance. The company was founded in May 2010.

Beginnings
Originally starting as a fourth-year design project at the University of Waterloo, cofounders Michael Litt, Devon Galloway, and Edward Wu launched the company in August 2011. On November 17, 2011, Vidyard announced $1.65 million in seed funding from investors including Softech VC, YouTube Co-founder Jawed Karim, Y Combinator (company), and GMail creator Paul Buchheit. Among the graduating class of Y Combinator, Vidyard was listed as second among five startups to keep an eye on, as well as fifth among the top 15 startups in Canada.

History 
Michael Litt was going into his last year of school while he was creating short explanation videos for companies along with co-founder Devon Galloway. A majority of their clients were putting their videos online with YouTube and Vimeo, but were complaining about both products. While brainstorming ideas for his end-of-curriculum design project, Michael Litt decided to build Vidyard, to address the video hosting issues that his clients were having. After graduating, he applied to Y Combinator and began raising funds to launch the company.

References

External links
 Official website
Online companies of Canada
Video hosting
Y Combinator companies
Canadian companies established in 2011
Companies based in Kitchener, Ontario
2011 establishments in Ontario